Pseudocopulation describes behaviors similar to copulation that serve a reproductive function for one or both participants but do not involve actual sexual union between the individuals. It is most generally applied to a pollinator attempting to copulate with a flower. Some flowers mimic a potential female mate visually, but the key stimuli are often chemical and tactile. This form of mimicry in plants is called Pouyannian mimicry.

Orchids commonly achieve reproduction in this manner, secreting chemicals from glands (osmophores) in the sepals, petals, or labellum, that are indistinguishable from the insect's natural pheromones. The pollinator then has a pollinium attached to its body, which it transfers to the stigma of another flower when it attempts another 'copulation'. Pollinators are often bees,  and wasps of the order Hymenoptera, and flies.

The cost to the pollinating insects might be seen as negligible, but study of Cryptostylis (an Australian orchid) pollinators shows that they may waste large amounts of sperm by ejaculating onto the flower. Thus there could be antagonistic coevolution such that pollinators become better at identifying their own species correctly and orchids become better mimics.

"Pseudocopulation" is also used to describe close physical contact between mating animals whose eggs are externally fertilized. Frogs provide one such case, with the male releasing sperm as the female discharges her eggs, a process called amplexus. In some species of starfish, a male and female may come together and form a pair. The male climbs on top, placing his arms between those of the female. When she releases eggs into the water, he is induced to release his sperm.

"Pseudocopulation" is also used to mean behaviours of birds that appear to be copulating but may merely involve mounting and could involve pairs of the same sex.

See also 
Parthenogenesis

References 

Mimicry
Animal sexuality
Sexual acts
Pollination